Specials is a short Unicode block of characters allocated at the very end of the Basic Multilingual Plane, at U+FFF0–FFFF. Of these 16 code points, five have been assigned since Unicode 3.0:
, marks start of annotated text
, marks start of annotating character(s)
, marks end of annotation block
, placeholder in the text for another unspecified object, for example in a compound document.
 used to replace an unknown, unrecognized, or unrepresentable character
 not a character.
 not a character.

FFFE and FFFF are not unassigned in the usual sense, but guaranteed not to be Unicode characters at all. They can be used to guess a text's encoding scheme, since any text containing these is by definition not a correctly encoded Unicode text. Unicode's  character can be inserted at the beginning of a Unicode text to signal its endianness: a program reading such a text and encountering 0xFFFE would then know that it should switch the byte order for all the following characters.

Its block name in Unicode 1.0 was Special.

Replacement character

The replacement character � (often displayed as a black rhombus with a white question mark) is a symbol found in the Unicode standard at code point U+FFFD in the Specials table. It is used to indicate problems when a system is unable to render a stream of data to a correct symbol. It is usually seen when the data is invalid and does not match any character:

Consider a text file containing the German word  (meaning 'for') encoded in ISO 8859-1 (0x66 0xFC 0x72). This file is now opened with a text editor that assumes the input is UTF-8. The first and third bytes are valid UTF-8 encodings of ASCII, but the second byte (0xFC) is not valid in UTF-8. A text editor could replace this byte with the replacement character to produce a valid string of Unicode code points for display, so the user sees "f�r".

A poorly implemented text editor might save the replacement character when writing the file back out; the data in the file will then become 0x66 0xEF 0xBF 0xBD 0x72. If the file is then re-opened using ISO-8859-1, it displays "fï¿½r" (this is called mojibake). Since the replacement is the same for all errors it is impossible to recover the original character. A design that is better (but harder to implement) is to preserve the original bytes, including the error, and only convert to the replacement when displaying the text. This will allow the text editor to save the original byte sequence, while still showing the error indicator to the user.

At one time the replacement character was often used when there was no glyph available in a font for that character. However, most modern text rendering systems instead use a font's  character, which in most cases is an empty box (or "?" or "X" in a box), sometimes called a 'tofu' (this browser displays 􏿾). There is no Unicode code point for this symbol.

Thus the replacement character is now only seen for encoding errors, such as invalid UTF-8. Some software attempts to hide this by translating the bytes of invalid UTF-8 to matching characters in Windows-1252 (since that is the most likely source of these errors), so that the replacement character is never seen.

Unicode chart

History
The following Unicode-related documents record the purpose and process of defining specific characters in the Specials block:

See also
 Unicode control characters

References 

Specials